Chapleau is a provincial electoral district in the Outaouais region of Quebec, Canada that elects members to the National Assembly of Quebec. It is located within the city of Gatineau.

It was created for the 1981 election from a part of Papineau electoral district.

In the change from the 2001 to the 2011 electoral map, its territory shifted slightly to the west. It gained territory west of Autoroute 50 from Gatineau electoral district, but lost some of its easternmost territory to Papineau electoral district.

It is named after former Quebec Premier Joseph-Adolphe Chapleau who was in power from 1879 to 1882.

For its first four decades, the riding was a Liberal stronghold. Located in the strongly federalist Outaouais region of West Quebec, the riding has many immigrants, federal public servants, and bilingual households, which are all demographic groups that tilt heavily towards the Liberals during provincial elections. More than 70% of the riding voted against sovereignty during the 1995 referendum.

The riding fell out of Liberal hands for the first time in 2018, when the Coalition Avenir Québec seized it en route to taking government.

Members of the National Assembly

Election results

 
|Liberal
|Marc Carrière
|align="right"|13,968
|align="right"|54.71
|align="right"|+9.68

|Independent
|Michel Soucy
|align="right"|118
|align="right"|0.46
|align="right"|-

 
|Liberal
|Benoît Pelletier
|align="right"|14,581
|align="right"|45.03
|align="right"|-17.36

 
|Liberal
|Benoît Pelletier
|align="right"|18,774
|align="right"|62.39
|align="right"|+3.17

 
|Liberal
|Benoît Pelletier
|align="right"|24,228
|align="right"|59,22
|align="right"|-4.07

 
|Socialist Democracy
|Julie Lavoie
|align="right"|281
|align="right"|0.69
|align="right"|-1.78

|Natural Law
|Jean-Claude Pommet
|align="right"|167
|align="right"|0.41
|align="right"|-0.15

 
|Liberal
|Claire Vaive
|align="right"|25,181
|align="right"|63.29
|align="right"|+8.05

 
|New Democrat
|Steve Fortin
|align="right"|984
|align="right"|2.47
|align="right"|-

|Natural Law
|Marie-Thérèse Nault
|align="right"|222
|align="right"|0.56
|align="right"|-

|Independent
|Jean-Pierre Winter
|align="right"|219
|align="right"|0.55
|align="right"|-

 
|Liberal
|John J. Kehoe
|align="right"|15,569
|align="right"|55.24
|align="right"|-5.25

 
|Liberal
|John J. Kehoe
|align="right"|16,154
|align="right"|60.49
|align="right"|+7.09

 
|New Democrat
|Jean-Philippe Rheault
|align="right"|686
|align="right"|2.51
|align="right"|-

|Parti Indépendantiste
|Marcel Vaive
|align="right"|188
|align="right"|0.69
|align="right"|

|Christian Socialist
|Stéphane Plouffe
|align="right"|99
|align="right"|0.36
|align="right"|-

 
|Liberal
|John J. Kehoe
|align="right"|15,364
|align="right"|53.44

References

External links
Information
 Elections Quebec

Election results
 Election results (National Assembly)

Maps
 2011 map (PDF)
 2001 map (Flash)
2001–2011 changes  (Flash)
1992–2001 changes (Flash)
 Electoral map of Outaouais region
 Quebec electoral map, 2011

Politics of Gatineau
Quebec provincial electoral districts